Stephen A. "Steve" DiMauro (November 29, 1932 – May 20, 2020) was a jockey, Champion trainer and successful breeder and owner in American Thoroughbred horse racing.

A native of Camden, New Jersey, in 1952 DiMauro was an apprentice jockey riding at racetracks in Florida and the New York area. Ten years later he began making his mark in the industry as a trainer, earning his first New York stakes race win on November 28, 1962 in the Remsen Stakes at Aqueduct Racetrack. In his early years conditioning Thoroughbreds, DiMauro had considerable success with horses belonging to the Golden Triangle Stables of Pittsburgh, Pennsylvania businessman, Tom Eazor. Among their successes was with the filly Lady Pitt who was voted the 1966 American Champion Three-Year-Old Filly. For other owners, DiMauro would train two more Champions  during his career, both coming in 1975. That year, Dearly Precious earned American Champion Two-Year-Old Filly honors and Wajima was voted the American Champion Three-Year-Old Male Horse. In 1975, DiMauro was voted the Eclipse Award for Outstanding Trainer. He bred numerous winners including two New York Bred Champions. He also received the award for the New York State Broodmare of the Year and was presented with the New York Breeder of the Year award in 1986. As part of his breeding and training programs he was part owner (with Harold Syner of Wajima fame) of Alamare Farm in Lexington, Kentucky and joint owner of Meadow Wood Training Center in Ocala, Florida.

DiMauro was responsible for mentoring and developing many of the horsemen involved in Thoroughbred racing today. His experience and insight into the sport has earned him much respect among many. He gave Richard Migliore a chance, and Richard "The Mig," was a well-known jockey for many years until his retirement in June 2010, and is still involved in the sport with the New York Racing Association. He gave Dominic Galluscio horses to train when he was just starting out on his own as a professional trainer. Dominic is today one of the more well-known claiming trainers in the New York circuit. DiMauro also took young exercise rider, Karen Shiels, under his wing, and gave her a chance when she was fresh out of college, grooming her to train on her own one day. Karen, under DiMauro's guidance and tutelage, ended up breaking in many of Steve's yearlings who went on to become stakes winners. Menifee, a Kentucky bred, out of Anne Campbell, by Harlan son of Storm Cat went on to run 2nd in the Kentucky Derby and 2nd in the Preakness in 1999. Besides mentoring and being busy with his training, breeding and farm management, he always found time to give back to the sport he loved so much. His service to the industry included board of directors positions with the New York Horsemens's Benevolent and Protection Association, the New York Backstretch Pension Fund, Breeder's Cup Ltd. and the New York Thoroughbred Breeding Fund (serving as president in 1982 and 1983).

Because of the multitude of accomplishments over a large number of years, Stephen DiMauro was nominated to the U.S. Racing Hall of Fame in February 2012. DiMauro was retired and resided in Florida with his wife Kathryn. His son, Stephen L. DiMauro has followed in his footsteps.

References

 DiMauro information at the NTRA
 September 22, 1975 Sports Illustrated article on Steve DiMauro and Wajima
 May 31, 1976 Sports Illustrated article on Steve DiMauro and Dearly Precious

1932 births
American horse trainers
Eclipse Award winners
Sportspeople from Camden, New Jersey
2020 deaths